Anthony Eugene Johnson (born July 17, 1990) is a former American football center. He was drafted by the Cincinnati Bengals in the seventh round of the 2013 NFL Draft. He played college football at the University of South Carolina and attended Aynor High School in Aynor, South Carolina.

Early years
Johnson played high school football for the Aynor High School Blue Jackets. He was named first-team all-state was by the Associated Press his senior year. He played in the 71st-annual Shrine Bowl of the Carolinas and was named to the All-Atlantic Region team by PrepStar magazine.

College career
Johnson played for the South Carolina Gamecocks from 2009 to 2012. He was redshirted in 2008. He earned Freshman All-SEC honors in 2009. He was selected to the second-team on Phil Steele's 2012 Midseason All-America and All-SEC teams. He was a member of the SEC Fall Academic Honor Roll. Johnson started a school record 53 games over his four seasons at the University of South Carolina. He played in the East–West Shrine Game following his senior season.

Professional career
Johnson was drafted by the Cincinnati Bengals with the 251st pick in the 2013 NFL Draft. He signed with the Bengals on May 8, 2013. He was released by the Bengals on August 31 and signed to the team's practice squad on September 1. He was signed to a futures contract by the Bengals on January 6, 2014. He made his NFL debut on September 21, 2014 against the Tennessee Titans.

On March 7, 2017, the Bengals extended a restricted free agent tender on Johnson. On March 17, 2017, Johnson signed a two-year contract with the Bengals. He played in 13 games with four starts at right guard before suffering a pectoral injury. He was placed on injured reserve on December 16, 2017.

On September 1, 2018, Johnson was released by the Bengals.

References

External links
NFL Draft Scout

Living people
1990 births
People from Aynor, South Carolina
Players of American football from South Carolina
American football centers
South Carolina Gamecocks football players
Cincinnati Bengals players